Dersum is a municipality in the Emsland district, in Lower Saxony, Germany. It lies between the River Ems in the east and the border with the Netherlands in the west. Haren is about 24 kilometers to the south and Papenburg about 17 kilometres to the north east.

References

Emsland